The Castle of Muskogee is a multipurpose fairground in Oklahoma located in Muskogee, about 135 miles east of  Oklahoma City and 55 miles southeast of Tulsa. The castle runs The Oklahoma Renaissance Festival from late April to Memorial Day weekend over 6 weeks. It also hosts a Halloween Festival from late September to Halloween, Castle Christmas from Thanksgiving to New Year's Eve and Boares Head Feast in mid November. The place was built from a warehouse and the surrounding field.

History 
The Castle Of Muskogee was built on the location of the old Muskogee Elks Lodge by Jeff Hiller who moved his fireworks superstore there. Construction around the original building gradually expanded. When a Renaissance fair first took place on the premises, the project to create The Castle of Muskogee started to bloom. The Halloween festival started in 1996.

Description 
The Castle of Muskogee is dedicated to promote the Arts and Humanities in the Muskogee community. The organization is a not-for-profit which owns and manages the 37,000 square feet of the fairground.

On a busy weekend, the fairground records an average 8,000 to 10,000 visitors. The castle can be rented for special events.

An Oklahoma inflatable ornaments collector provides the Castle with numerous inflatable garden decorations displayed alongside a half-mile road on the fairground.

Renaissance festival 
Held annually in May during 5 weeks, the renaissance festival gathers 600 artisans and performers in authentic grab. The site features 15 stages over 30 acres plus 40 acres of parking. It is set in 1569 during the reign of Elizabeth I. Its main feature is the Castleton Village, a 13-acre area where the majority of merchants reside.

There is a clothing shop on the fairground to rent a costume.

2020 saw no festival.

Halloween festival 
Held annually in October during 5 weeks, the Halloween festival takes place in Castleton Village with 11 attractions. It takes 6 weeks to set up the fairground for Halloween, and four days to tear everything down. In 2015, a new attraction was introduced, Zombie Hunt!.

Other events 
 Castle Christmas: held annually in the castle grounds, provides a light display with over 2,000 lights.
 Castle Zombie Run: held annually in September.
 Boares Head Feast: held annually in November and provides a four-course meal as well as entertainment.

The area also sells fireworks during the Fourth of July and New Year's Eve holiday seasons.

See also 
 List of Renaissance fairs

References

External links 
 Official website

Amusement parks in Oklahoma
Amusement parks opened in 1995
Renaissance fairs
Festivals in Oklahoma
Muskogee, Oklahoma